The Ranger 32 is an American sailboat that was designed by Gary Mull as an International Offshore Rule Three-Quarter Ton class racer and first built in 1973. The design is out of production.

The Ranger 32 is a development of Swampfire, the winner of the first 3/4 ton cup championship held at Miami in 1974.

Production
The boat was built by Ranger Yachts in the United States, starting in 1973, with 147 boats completed.

Design
The Ranger 32 is a small recreational keelboat, built predominantly of fiberglass, with wood trim. It has a fractional sloop masthead sloop rig, a rudder mounted on a skeg and a fixed fin keel. It displaces  and carries  of lead ballast.

The design has sleeping accommodation for four people, with a double "V"-berth in the bow cabin and two straight settees in the main cabin. The galley is located on the port side just forward of the companionway ladder. The galley is "L"-shaped and is equipped with a two-burner stove, ice box and a sink. A navigation station is opposite the galley, on the starboard side. The head is located just aft of the bow cabin on the port side and includes a shower.

The boat has a PHRF racing average handicap of 162 with a high of 172 and low of 156.

Operational history
Dennis Conner, three times America's Cup winner, trained for those high level races on boats that he owned, including his Ranger 32, sailed before his first win in 1980.

The 1980 San Diego Yachting Cup Half Ton class was won by a Ranger 32, Skoom captained by Mike Busch.

See also
List of sailing boat types

Similar sailboats
Aloha 32
Bayfield 30/32
Beneteau 323
C&C 32
Columbia 32
Contest 32 CS
Douglas 32
Hunter 32 Vision
Hunter 326
Mirage 32
Morgan 32
Nonsuch 324
Ontario 32
Watkins 32

References

Keelboats
1970s sailboat type designs
Sailing yachts
Sailboat type designs by Gary Mull
Sailboat types built by Ranger Yachts